Asilus is a genus of robber flies in the family Asilidae. There are at least 150 described species in Asilus.

See also
 List of Asilus species

References

Further reading

External links

 

Asilinae
Articles created by Qbugbot
Asilidae genera
Taxa named by Carl Linnaeus